Ikari III: The Rescue (also known as Ikari Warriors III: The Rescue), known simply as  in Japan, is an arcade run & gun shoot 'em up. It was ported to the NES, IBM PC compatibles, and Commodore 64. It is the third and final installment of the Ikari Warriors series after Ikari Warriors and Victory Road. The NES version was shown at the 1991 CES.

Plot
The presidential candidate's child has been kidnapped by the terrorist organization Crime Ghost masterminded by Faust. Top officials have asked the 2 best soldiers to infiltrate Crime Ghost's base and liberate the child.

Gameplay
While the game still uses the rotary joystick, a version exists that forgoes the rotary feature altogether. The weapon selection is greatly reduced from previous games, and there are no player usable vehicles. Weapons are much rarer, which makes the game more focused on hand-to-hand combat consisting of punching, kicking, jump kicks and roundhouse kicks.

Ports

The NES console version maintains the characters design and basic gameplay from the arcade version with a variety of enemies and weapons and life bars for the players. The 1989 IBM version box art "Ikari III" was produced for SNK by Marc Ericksen following his earlier renditions for SNK's Guerrilla War and P.O.W. releases, and as in the arcade version, the kidnapped child is a young boy. The NES version plot is slightly different from the arcade version with an expanded background, the Ikari Warriors are named Paul and Vince, the kidnapped child is a girl instead of a boy, and there is a 4th stage exclusive to the NES port, which has the warriors scuba diving in a stage resembling a side scrolling shooter.

References

External links
NES manual
Ikari III: The Rescue at Arcade History

1989 video games
Arcade video games
Commodore 64 games
DOS games
SNK beat 'em ups
SNK Playmore games
Nintendo Entertainment System games
Nintendo Switch games
PlayStation Network games
PlayStation 4 games
Video game sequels
Video games about terrorism
Video games scored by Kikuko Hataya
Video games set in the 21st century
Video games developed in Japan
Hamster Corporation games